The Daily News is a newspaper published daily, except Monday and Saturday, in Wahpeton, Richland County, North Dakota.  Its readers are the communities of Wahpeton and Breckenridge, Wilkin County, Minnesota.  The newspaper was founded in 1971 and is owned by Wick Communications.  It had a daily print circulation of 2,199 in 2019.   The newspaper also has a digital website and presence on Facebook.

See also
List of newspapers in Minnesota
List of newspapers in South Dakota

References

Newspapers published in North Dakota
Newspapers published in Minnesota
Wahpeton, North Dakota
Newspapers established in 1971
1971 establishments in North Dakota